The 2000 Singapore Challenge, also known as the 2000 Godrej Singapore Challenge for sponsorship reasons, was a One Day International cricket tournament that took place 20–27 August 2000. The tournament was held in Singapore. The tournament was won by South Africa who defeated Pakistan by 93 runs by the Duckworth–Lewis method.

Teams

Squads

Fixtures

Group stage

Points Table

Matches

Final

Statistics

See also

1999 Singapore Challenge

References

External links
2000 Singapore Challenge  at CricketArchive

2000 in Singaporean sport
International cricket competitions from 1997–98 to 2000
One Day International cricket competitions
International cricket competitions in Singapore